Grzegorz Hyży (born 27 May 1987, Gniezno) is a Polish singer-songwriter, who rose to fame after finishing as the runner-up in the third series of X Factor in 2013. He is currently signed to Sony Music.

Debut album
In March 2014, Hyży released his debut single "Na chwilę" and is set to release his album later in the year.

Discography

Albums

Singles

As featured artist

Awards and nominations

References

Living people
Polish pop singers
1987 births
21st-century Polish male singers
21st-century Polish singers
People from Gniezno